Raymond Cyril Ellis (12 May 1897 – 22 October 1955) was an  Australian rules footballer who played with Geelong in the Victorian Football League (VFL).

Notes

External links 

1897 births
1955 deaths
Australian rules footballers from Victoria (Australia)
Geelong Football Club players
Barwon Football Club players